AMFI, the association of all the Asset Management Companies of SEBI registered mutual funds in India, was incorporated on August 22, 1995, as a non-profit organisation. As of now, 42 Asset Management Companies that are registered with SEBI, are its members. Most mutual funds firms in India are its members. The organisation aims to develop the mutual funds market in India, by improving ethical and professional standards. AMFI was incorporated on 22 August 1995. As of April 2015, there are 44 members. These are asset management companies which are registered with AMFI with assets under management of over Rs 27 lakh crore.

References

External links
 Official website
 AMFI Exam Preparation website

Mutual funds of India
Financial services companies established in 1995
Financial services companies based in Mumbai
1995 establishments in Maharashtra